Waddon Hill is a hill and the site of an old Roman fort near Beaminster, in the English county of Dorset. The name Waddon is from the Old English meaning wheat hill.

The Wessex Ridgeway passes to the north of the hill summit and Roman fort. The B3162 road passes close to the western end of the hill.

There is no public right of way on the summit of Waddon Hill.

Roman fort
The fort is on a narrow east-west ridge reaching a height of 210 m, with steep natural slopes to the south and west, and linear ramparts facing north and east.

The fort was built by the Second Legion under Vespasian, during their conquest of the Durotriges and occupation of Dorset. It is possible that the fort originated as a temporary camp during the campaign against nearby Pilsdon Pen, where two Roman ballista bolts have been found.

First recognition of the site came when 19th century quarrying uncovered military artefacts from the 1st century AD. The site was investigated by Graham Webster in a series of archaeological excavations starting in 1959, which revealed the full layout of the camp, except for some small areas destroyed by the quarrying. The permanent structure of the fort appears to have been built and occupied in the period 50-60 AD, following the abandonment of Hod Hill further east. The Roman road to Waddon seems to have left the main Dorchester-Axminster road at Two Gates, passed through Eggardon Hill, then south of Beaminster, to enter Waddon from the east.

See also 
 Lewesdon Hill
 Pilsdon Pen
 Hod Hill

References 
 Dorset and the Second Legion, N.Field (1992), 

Hills of Dorset
History of Dorset
Roman fortifications in England
Archaeological sites in Dorset
Roman legionary fortresses in England